Poquette is a surname. Notable people with the surname include:

 Ben Poquette (born 1955), American basketball player
 Tom Poquette (born 1951), American baseball player